The astral plane is a non-physical realm of existence.

Astral plane may also refer to:
 "Astral Plane" (Adventure Time), an episode of Adventure Time
 The Astral Plane, a plane of Dungeons & Dragons
 "Astral Planes", a single from the album Teargarden by Kaleidyscope by the Smashing Pumpkins
 Astral planes, an alternative name for planes 1–16 of the Unicode standard